Mount Schimansky is a ridge-like mountain 6 nautical miles (11 km) northwest of Heintz Peak of the Welch Mountains, in Palmer Land. Mapped by the United States Geological Survey (USGS) in 1974. Named by Advisory Committee on Antarctic Names (US-ACAN) for Lieutenant Commander John A. Schimansky, U.S. Navy, Commander of LC-130 aircraft of Squadron VXE-6 on many aerial photographic and ice-sensing missions over the Antarctic continent during Operation Deep Freeze, 1970 and 1971.

Mountains of Palmer Land